Astrothelium tanianum is a species of corticolous (bark-dwelling) lichen in the family Trypetheliaceae. Found in Malaysia, it was formally described as a new species in 2019 by lichenologists André Aptroot and Harrie Sipman. It has roughly spherical ascomata, measuring 0.7–1.3 mm in diameter, which occur singly in tiny warts (verrucae) on the thallus surface. The ascospores are hyaline with typically about 11 septa (ranging from 9 to 15) and measure 75–100 by 20–22 μm. The specific epithet tanianum honours Philippine bryologist Benito Tan (1946–2016), one of the collectors of the type.

References

tanianum
Lichen species
Lichens described in 2019
Lichens of Malaysia
Taxa named by André Aptroot
Taxa named by Harrie Sipman